Wirt is an unincorporated community in Wirt Township, Itasca County, Minnesota, United States; located within the Chippewa National Forest.

The community is located 16 miles northwest of Talmoon at the junction of Itasca County Roads 29 and 31.  County Road 14 is also nearby.

Nearby places include Dora Lake, Max, Spring Lake, and Alvwood.  Wirt is located 17 miles west of Bigfork; and 25 miles southeast of Northome.  Wirt is 16 miles east of Alvwood; and 36 miles north of Deer River.

The community of Wirt is located within Wirt Township (population 106).  The Big Fork River flows through the community.

Wirt has a post office with ZIP code 56688.

References

 Rand McNally Road Atlas – 2007 edition – Minnesota entry
 Official State of Minnesota Highway Map – 2011/2012 edition
 Mn/DOT map of Itasca County – Sheet 2 – 2011 edition

Unincorporated communities in Itasca County, Minnesota
Unincorporated communities in Minnesota